The  is a group of burial mounds located in the city of Gyōda, Saitama Prefecture, in the Kantō region of Japan. The site was designated a National Historic Site in 1938, and was upgraded in status to a Special National Historic Site of Japan  in 2020. The site consists of nine large kofun, which were built in the 5th to 7th centuries AD, i.e. from the late Kofun period into the Asuka period, when the construction of burial mounds was already out of fashion in western Japan.

Overview
The area of  "Sakitama" is the area which gave its name to become modern Saitama Prefecture. The site now consists of eight large , which are shaped like a keyhole, having one square end and one circular end, when viewed from above, and one large circular-type kofun.  However, the area formerly included an additional 35 smaller circular-type kofun and one more square-type, all of which have now been destroyed by urban encroachment and land development. 

According to the Nihon Shoki chronicle, in 534 AD, Emperor Ankan appointed Nao Kasahara as Kuni no miyatsuko after he won a succession battle in Musashi Province for that post, and miraculously a keyhole-shaped tomb appeared in Kasahara, Saitama Country (present-day Konosu, Saitama) overnight, indicating the favor of the Yamato kingdom. This has led to a theory that the Musashi Kokufu was originally in this location, although the ruins of a provincial capital have been found in southern Musashi in the city pf Kokubunji, Tokyo. In any event, the tumuli in this area date from the end of the 5th century to the 7th century AD. The existence of these tumuli were known in the Edo period and were commented upon in local histories, such as the "Shinpen Musashi Fudoki". 

In 1893, the Shōgunyama Kofun was excavated and in 1935 a survey of the area indicated that 11 keyhole-shaped and 11 circular-type mounds existed. In 1938, nine largest burial mounds were designated as national historic sites. Maintenance on these tumuli began in 1966, and in 1968, then Inariyama Kofun was excavated, revealing a gold-inlaid iron sword (the Inariyama Sword).

Saitama Prefecture and the city of Gyōda are promoting the site for inclusion as a UNESCO World Heritage Site, as a preliminary step, the site's designation was changed from a National Heritage Site to a Special National Heritage Site in 2020.

List of kofun

See also
List of Historic Sites of Japan (Saitama)

References

External links
Gyoda City home page
Saitama Prefecture home page 
Museum of the Sakitama Ancient Burial Mounds 

Archaeological sites in Japan
Kofun period
Gyōda
History of Saitama Prefecture
Special Historic Sites